Čepinci (Prekmurje Slovene: Čöpinci) is a dispersed village in the Municipality of Šalovci in the Prekmurje region of Slovenia.

The source of the Big Krka River is in the settlement.

The poet Ferenc Marics lived in the village.

References

External links 

Čepinci on Geopedia

Populated places in the Municipality of Šalovci